Universitetet ("the University") is a Metro station in the Frescati area, close to Stockholm University (Stockholms universitet), and the Museum of Natural History. It was opened on 12 January 1975 as the northern terminus of the extension from Tekniska högskolan. On 29 January 1978, the line was extended north to Mörby centrum.

Since the 1990s, the art on the station consists of tiles featuring Carl von Linné and the UN Declaration of Universal Human Rights, created by Belgian and Parisian artist Françoise Schein. The station includes 12 large tiles panels all dedicated to the travels of Linné around the Baltic. The artist used the travels as the starting point to develop the theme of nature and present-day ecological problems. The work was created in Lisbon on azulejos, then brought to Stockholm.

Not far from the station is the Universitetet railway station and several bus lines.

References

External links
Images of Universitetet station
www.inscrire.com

Red line (Stockholm metro) stations
Railway stations opened in 1975
Stockholm University
Railway stations at university and college campuses